Choctaw Lake is a reservoir in the U.S. state of Mississippi.

Choctaw Lake is named after the Choctaw Indians.

References

Reservoirs in Mississippi
Bodies of water of Choctaw County, Mississippi
Mississippi placenames of Native American origin